Marhoom Baba Zahiere Lye (7 November 1900 - 1969) was a Ceylonese Malay politician. He appointed as Member of Parliament in 1963. He married Evelyn Mashmoon Saldin, daughter of M. K. Saldin, member of the State Council of Ceylon.

References

1900 births
1969 deaths
Members of the 5th Parliament of Ceylon
Sri Lankan Malays